Acacia bracteolata is a shrub belonging to the genus Acacia and the subgenus Phyllodineae endemic to Western Australia. 

It blooms in August and produces yellow flowers. The spherical flower-heads can have an obloid shape and have a diameter of  containing 19 to 25 lemon yellow coloured flowers.

It is native to an area in the  Goldfields-Esperance region of Western Australia where it is found east of Esperance growing in granitic sandy soils. The shrub occurs from around Grass Patch in the north to Cape Arid National Park in the south and are often part of shrubland or low mallee communities.

See also
List of Acacia species

References

bracteolata
Acacias of Western Australia
Plants described in 1999
Taxa named by Bruce Maslin